The Battle of Zacatecas in 1835 took place on 11 May 1835 in the immediate vicinity of the capital city in the state of Zacatecas, Mexico, between elements of the federal army under the command of Gen. Antonio López de Santa Anna and elements of the rebel army, which was commanded by General Francisco García Salinas during the Rebellion in Zacatecas of 1835.

Battle 
García Salinas went out with his citizens to settle in the Guadalupe field, where Santa Anna attacked him at five in the morning on May 11 with 3,400 men. The action was very close for 2 hours. At 9 o'clock, the victory was declared by Santa Anna, who captured 800 prisoners according to him. The number increased to 2,723 on the 14th. Santa Anna had a loss of 100 men (including the dead, wounded and scattered). In contrast, General Joaquin Parres took Fresnillo and Sombrerete without spilling a single drop of blood. The entrance to Zacatecas was followed by disorder and war crimes by his troops, who stole houses from foreigners.

References

Further reading 

Zacatecas